Vincent Ward may refer to:
Vincent Ward (director) (born 1956), New Zealand film director, screenwriter and artist
Vincent Ward (politician) (1886–1946), New Zealand politician
Vincent M. Ward (born 1971), American actor